Valeri Vladimirovich Belenki (born 5 September 1969) is a retired Azerbaijani artistic gymnast who competed in the 1992 and 1996 Summer Olympics.

Career
Belenki was born and raised in Baku, Azerbaijan SSR, Soviet Union (present day Azerbaijan), in a Jewish family.

He competed for the Soviet Union/Unified Team until 1992 when this federation was disbanded following the breakup of the Soviet Union.

Belenki's greatest achievements are the team gold and all around bronze he won with the Unified Team in the 1992 Olympics in Barcelona. Belenky also won gold in the pommel horse event at the 1991 World Artistic Gymnastics Championships, where he competed for the USSR.

Because Azerbaijan did not have a gymnastics federation for him to compete for in the 1993 world championships in Birmingham, Belenky instead competed as an unattached athlete. In 1994 he became a German citizen and represented that nation in the 1996 Olympics, helping the team to a seventh-place finish and coming 6th in the all-around.

In 2013, he was elected to the International Jewish Sports Hall of Fame. In 2015, he was inducted into the International Gymnastics Hall of Fame as a representative of Azerbaijan.

See also

List of select Jewish gymnasts

References

External links
Valery Belenky

1969 births
Living people
Soviet male artistic gymnasts
Azerbaijani male artistic gymnasts
German male artistic gymnasts
Olympic gymnasts of the Unified Team
Olympic gymnasts of Germany
Gymnasts at the 1992 Summer Olympics
Gymnasts at the 1996 Summer Olympics
Olympic gold medalists for the Unified Team
Olympic bronze medalists for the Unified Team
World champion gymnasts
Medalists at the World Artistic Gymnastics Championships
Sportspeople from Baku
Soviet Azerbaijani people
Azerbaijani Jews
Jewish gymnasts
Olympic medalists in gymnastics
Soviet Jews
International Jewish Sports Hall of Fame inductees
Medalists at the 1992 Summer Olympics
Recipients of the Order of Merit of Baden-Württemberg